Candelaria or Candelária may refer to:

People
 Jacob Candelaria (born 1986 or 1987), U.S. politician and attorney
 John Candelaria (born 1953), American baseball pitcher
 Luis Candelaria (1892-1963), Argentinian military aviator, who completed the first air crossing of the Andes in 1918
 Nash Candelaria (born 1928), American author
 Candelaria Pérez (1810–1870), sergeant in the Chilean Army, hero of the Battle of Yungay

Places

Argentina
 Candelaria, Misiones, Misiones Province
 Candelaria, San Luis, a village and municipality in San Luis Province
 La Candelaria, Catamarca, a village and municipality in Catamarca Province
 La Candelaria, Salta, a village and rural municipality in Salta Province

Brazil
 Candelária Church, a historical church in Rio de Janeiro
 Candelária, Rio Grande do Sul

Chile
 Candelaria mine, a copper deposit in Atacama Region

Colombia
 Candelaria, Valle del Cauca
 Candelaria, Atlántico
 La Candelaria, Bogotá, a historic neighborhood in Bogotá

Cuba
 Candelaria, Cuba, Artemisa Province

El Salvador
 Candelaria, Cuscatlán
 Candelaria de la Frontera

Guatemala
 Candelaria Caves, a natural cave system in the municipalities of Chisec and Raxruha

Honduras
 Candelaria, Lempira

Mexico
 Candelaria Municipality, Campeche
 Candelaria Loxicha
 Candelaria metro station, a station on the Mexico City Metro

Philippines
 Candelaria, Quezon
 Candelaria, Zambales

Portugal
 Candelária (Madalena), a civil parish in the municipality of Madalena, island of Pico, Azores
 Candelária (Ponta Delgada), a civil parish in the municipality of Ponta Delgada, island of São Miguel, Azores

Puerto Rico
 Mayagüez, Puerto Rico, founded as Nuestra Señora de la Candelaria
 Candelaria, Lajas, Puerto Rico, a barrio
 Candelaria, Toa Baja, Puerto Rico, a barrio
 Candelaria, Vega Alta, Puerto Rico, a barrio

Spain
 Candelaria, Tenerife, a municipality in the island of Tenerife, Santa Cruz de Tenerife, Canary Islands

United States
Candelaria, Texas, Presidio County
Candelaria, Nevada, a mining ghost town

Religion
 Fiesta de la Candelaria or Candlemas
 Virgin of Candelaria, an apparition of the Virgin Mary

Other
 Candelaria (lichen), a genus of yellow lichens
 Candelaria (reptile), an extinct genus of owenettid parareptiles
 Candelária massacre, a 1993 massacre in Rio de Janeiro, Brazil
 Candelária Sport Clube, a roller hockey team from the civil parish of Candelária

See also
 Candelario (disambiguation)
 La Candelaria (disambiguation)